The year 1957 in archaeology involved some significant events.

Explorations
Minaret of Jam site in Afghanistan surveyed by André Maricq, Gaston Wiet and Ahmed Ali Kohzad.

Excavations
August–September - Chestnuts Long Barrow, one of the Medway Megaliths in south-east England.
So-called 'mound of Midas', the Great Tumulus near Gordium.
Monastic cell on Iona believed to belong to Columba, by Charles Thomas.
1957–1960 - James Mellaart at Hacilar.
1957–1961 - Ralph Solecki at Shanidar, Iraq.

Publications
 Medieval Archaeology the journal of the Society for Medieval Archaeology first published

Finds
 Right arm of Laocoön and his Sons
 Sperlonga sculptures
 Ban Chiang
 Maine penny

Awards

Miscellaneous

Births
 October 21 - Julian Cope, English post-punk singer-songwriter and antiquarian

Deaths
 October 19 - V. Gordon Childe, Australian prehistorian of Europe (b. 1892)
 November 9 - Alan Wace, English Classical archaeologist (b. 1879)
 November 28 - O. G. S. Crawford, British archaeologist (b. 1866)
 May 12 - J. F. S. Stone, British archaeologist. (b. 1891)
 Grace Mary Crowfoot, English textile archaeologist (b. 1879)

References

Archaeology
Archaeology
Archaeology by year